Football Club de Nantes (Gallo: Naunnt), commonly referred to as FC Nantes or simply Nantes, is a women's football club based in Nantes, France. It has been the women's section of FC Nantes since 2012. Coached by Mathieu Ricoul, the club competes in the Division 2 Féminine.

History 
In the summer of 2012, the plan to create a women's section of FC Nantes took effect. Firstly, youth teams were put in place, with the objective being to become a competitive feminine football club at a national scale in the long run. The senior team entered the league system in 2014, starting from the lowest tier, the third division of the District de Football de Loire-Atlantique.

The team rapidly progressed, successively finishing first in the third, second, and first district divisions, accessing the regional level of women's football in France ahead of the 2017–18 season. The team would shine once again during that season, finishing first in their Régional 2 group and reaching the final of the Coupe des Pays de la Loire. In the 2018–19 season, Nantes finished second in the Régional 1 behind Le Mans. The club therefore qualified for the play-offs for promotion to the Division 2 Féminine, where the team would eventually eliminate CA Paris and Le Mans. Nantes therefore reached the national level of football for the first time in the club's history, five years after the first team's entrance into the league system.

The first season in the Division 2 for Nantes was ended prematurely due to the COVID-19 pandemic, although the team did place fourth before the suspension of the league. The 2020–21 season was ended even earlier than the previous season; Nantes finished in second place in Group A. Despite a hope for promotion via play-offs, the French Football Federation finally decided that only Saint-Étienne would be promoted and that Nantes would stay in the Division 2.

On 30 July 2021, Nantes announced the appointment of Mathieu Ricoul as head coach to replace Tanguy Fétiveau, who had been managing the team since June 2017. At the beginning of the 2021–22 season, the club would have 
a budget of €1 million and twelve federal contracts, the maximum amount in the Division 2, with hopes of achieving promotion to the Division 1 Féminine.

Managerial history 

 2017–2021:  Tanguy Fétiveau
 2021–2022:  Mathieu Ricoul
 2022–Present:  Oswaldo Vizcarrondo

Players

Current squad 
.

Notable former players 

  Sherly Jeudy
  Yvonne Leuko

References

External links 

 Club website

FC Nantes (women)
FC Nantes (women)
2012 establishments in France
Association football clubs established in 2012
Nantes
Nantes (women)